Keratin 37 is a protein that in humans is encoded by the KRT37 gene.   KRT37 is a member of the keratin gene family.

Clinical significance 

KRT37 is the only keratin that is regulated by androgens. This sensitivity to androgens was acquired by Homo sapiens and is not shared with their great ape cousins. Although Winter et al. found that KRT37 is expressed in all the hair follices of chimpanzees, it was not detected in the head hair of modern humans. As androgens are known to grow hair on the body but decrease it on the scalp, this lack of scalp KRT37 may help explain the paradoxical nature of Androgenic alopecia as well as the fact that head hair anagen cycles are extremely long. Moreover, variations in the gene may account for ethnic differences in body and facial hair.

References